Bohdana Froliak (or Bohdana Frolyak; born 5 May 1968 in Vydyniv, Ivano-Frankivsk Oblast, Ukrainian SSR) is a modern Ukrainian composer.

Biography
Froliak made her first musical steps in her native village under the guidance of Vasyl Kufliuk, a village teacher who gained educational and musical graduation in Warsaw. In 1986, she graduated from Solomiya Krushelnytska Lviv Musical School after studying piano, music theory and composition. In 1991, she graduated from Lviv Conservatory as a composer.<ref name="AnmDB">[http://www.anm.odessa.ua/mic/mic-cbase.html Ukrainian Composers Database at New Music Association'''s site]  (pick from list)</ref> Her teachers in the academy were Volodymyr Flys and Myroslav Skoryk. In 1998, Frolyak completed a non-degree postgraduate course of the same university. In 2009, she attended two courses at the faculty of composition and faculty of contemporary music and jazz of Academy of Music in Kraków (Poland).

Since 1991 she has been a lecturer at faculty of musical composition at Lviv Conservatory.
She is also a member of the Ukrainian Composers’ Union.

Scholarships and awards
 Scholarships:
 2001 — scholarship of Warsaw Autumn Friends' Foundation and Ernst von Siemens Musikstiftung;Bohdana Frolyak's page at Warsaw Autumn Festival site
 2004 — scholarship Gaude Polonia from Minister of Culture of Poland;
 Awards:
 2000 — Levko Revutsky award in the field of composition;
 2005 — Borys Liatoshynskyj state award in the field of composition;

Major works
 Orchestral
 Symphony No. 1 Orbis Terrarum — 1998;
 Symphony No. 2— 2009;
 Concerto for piano and orchestra (for young players) — 2000;
 Concerto for clarinet and orchestra — 2004–2005;
 "U vozdukhakh plavayut' lisy..."() on versus by Vasyl Stefanyk and Nazar Honchar for clarinet, cello, piano, mixed choir and stringed instruments — 2002;
 Vestigia for violin, viola and stringed instruments — 2003;
 Kyrie eleison for mixed choir and strings — 2004;
 Daemmerung for clarinet and strings — 2005;
 Agnus Dei for mixed choir and strings — 2006;
 Jak modlitwa on versus by Adam Zagajewski for soprano and orchestra — 2007;
 Clarification for cello and strings — 2006;
 Small ensembles and solo
 "Why should i, like a tim'rous bird, to distant mountains fly?" (according to Psalm No. 10(11) from the Book of Psalms) for flute, alto flute, clarinet, bass clarinet, alto saxophone (english horn in the initial edition), violin, viola and cello — 2001;
 Stück for piano — 2004;
 Partita–meditation for two violins — 2007;
 Lamento for piano trio — 2007;
 Suite in C for cello and piano — 2008;
 Inventions'' for eight cellos — 2009;

Festivals
 Contrasts in Lviv, Ukraine;
 Kyiv-Music-Fest in Kyiv, Ukraine;
 Premieres of the Season in Kyiv;
 Two days and two nights of new music in Odessa, Ukraine;
 Days of Ukrainian music in Warsaw, Poland and Moscow, Russia;
 Days of Ukrainian sacred music in Uzhhorod, Ukraine;
 Days of Music by Kraków Composers in Kraków, Poland;
 Starosądecki Festiwal Muzyki Dawnej in Stary Sącz, Poland;
 Warsaw Autumn in Warsaw, Poland;
 Muzyka w Sandomierzu in Sandomierz, Poland;
 At Cultural Crossroads in Krakow and Stary Sącz, Poland;
 MENHIR 2005 music festival falera in Switzerland;

Notes

External links 
 Composer's website

1968 births
Living people
People from Ivano-Frankivsk Oblast
Ukrainian classical composers
20th-century classical composers
Lviv Conservatory alumni
Women classical composers
20th-century women composers